The 1961 Arkansas State Indians football team represented Arkansas State College—now known as Arkansas State University—as an independent during the 1961 NCAA College Division football season. Led by second-year head coach King Block, the Indians compiled a record of 3–6.

Schedule

References

Arkansas State
Arkansas State Red Wolves football seasons
Arkansas State Indians football